Vidisha is considered to be Puranakshetras Jain tirtha. The Jain temples are located in Vidisha district in state of Madhya Pradesh, India. According to Jain belief, Vidisha is the birthplace of Shitalanatha, the tenth tirthankar. Here the first 108 feet elevated temple with all Tirthankaras with Shitalanatha as the principal deity is under construction.

Jain cave 

According to Jain belief, Vidisha is one of the first places where the Jain images were worshipped. The earliest of these are two Jain caves of Udayagiri. Only a torso remains of one cave, and this torso is now exhibited in an open-air museum.

Cave 20 is the only cave in the Udayagiri Caves complex is dedicated to Jainism. It is on the northwestern edge of the hills. At the entrance is the image of the Jain Tirthankara Parshvanatha sitting under a serpent hood.

Jain temples

Bada Mandir 

Bada Mandir is one of the fourteen Jain temples present in Vidisha. The temple is built in Mughal architecture. The bada mandir consists of a miraculous Jain idol which is considered to be older than the temple.

Bajramath Jain temple 

Bajramath Jain temple is situated in Gyaraspur and dates back to the 9th century. This temple enshrines three garbhagrihas with the temple is fully decorated with Jain sculptures. The temple was earlier a Brahmical temple dedicate to Surya but was transformed to a Jain temple. All three shrines of this temple are now occupied with idols of tirthankaras.

Maladevi temple 

Maladevi temple dates back to the 9th century. This is a rock-cut temple built in Pratihara style. The temple was initially a Brahmical temple but later converted to a Jain worship site. The temple is dedicated to Adinatha. The Maladevi temple is considered one of the best examples of its collection of varied Jain sculptures.

Gadarmal Devi temple 

Gadarmal Devi temple dates back to the 9th century. The architecture of this yogini temple is a fusion of Pratihara and Parmara styles. It is built similar to Teli ka Mandir in Gwalior fort. This temple houses both Hindu and Jain idols. The temple is made of sandstone with seven small shrines surrounding the main shrine.

Pataria Jain temples 

Pataria Jain temples was built in the 9th century in Badoh city. These are a cluster of 25 temples with the main shrine surmounted with shikharas; the other shrines have a flat roof, shikharas, and dome.

Restoration 
In 1930, Gwalior state stepped up to conserve Maladevi temple. All of the monuments in Vidisha are protected by Archaeological Survey of India.

Gallery

See also 

 Siddhachal Caves
 Gwalior fort
 Vidisha
 Beejamandal
 Sironj

References

Citations

Sources 

 
 
  
  
  
 
  
 
 
 
 
 
 
 

Jain architecture
Jain art
Jain temples in Madhya Pradesh
9th-century Jain temples
Tourist attractions in Vidisha district